Jacques Gernet (22 December 1921, Algiers, French Algeria – 3 March 2018, Vannes) was an eminent French sinologist of the second half of the 20th century. His best-known work is The Chinese Civilization, a 900-page summary of Chinese history and civilization which has been translated into many languages.

Biography
Gernet obtained a degree in classics at the University of Algiers in 1942, then served in World War II from 1942-1945. In 1947 he received his degree in Chinese from the National School of Oriental Languages, and in 1948 from the Ecole Pratique des Hautes Etudes (EPHE). He then became a member of the French School of the Far East, before being a researcher at CNRS and Scholar of the Yomiuri Shimbun in Japan. He received his Doctor of Letters in 1956.

From 1955–1976 Gernet served as director of studies at the EPHE, VIe section, then at the Ecole des Hautes Etudes en Sciences Sociales. He taught Chinese language and culture at the Faculty of Arts from the Sorbonne in 1957, first as a lecturer, then as professor from 1959. In 1968 he founded the Unit of teaching and research of languages and civilizations of East Asia (University of Paris-VII), and was its director until 1973. He entered the Collège de France, where he was chair in social and intellectual history of China (1975–1992).

On 8 June 1979 Gernet was elected a member of the Académie des Inscriptions et Belles-Lettres. He is also a chevalier of the Légion d'honneur and commander of the Ordre des Palmes académiques.

Gernet died in Vannes on 3 March 2018.

Publications
 1949 : Entretiens du maître de dhyâna Chen-houei du Ho-tsö (668-760), Hanoi, EFEO (PEFEO, 31).
 1956 : Les Aspects économiques du bouddhisme dans la société chinoise du Ve au Xe siècle, Saigon, EFEO (PEFEO, 39). †
 1959 : La Vie quotidienne en Chine à la veille de l'invasion mongole, Paris, Hachette. †
 1970 : Catalogue des manuscrits chinois de la Bibliothèque nationale, fonds Pelliot de Touen-houang, vol. 1, Paris, Bibliothèque nationale. With Wu Chi-yü. 
 1972 : Le Monde chinois, Paris, A. Colin. † Translated as A History of Chinese Civilization, Cambridge: Cambridge University Press, 1995. (2nd ed.) (English translation)
 1982 : Chine et christianisme, action et réaction, Paris, Gallimard. †
 1991 : Tang Zhen, Écrits d'un sage encore inconnu, Paris, Gallimard.
 1994 : L'Intelligence de la Chine : le social et le mental, Paris, Gallimard.
 2005 : La Raison des choses: Essai sur la philosophie de Wang Fuzhi (1619–1692), Paris, Gallimard.

† Translated into English.

References

External links 
 Biography: EFEO (French)
 Biographie: Académie des inscriptions (French) 

French sinologists
1921 births
2018 deaths
French military personnel of World War II
Members of the Académie des Inscriptions et Belles-Lettres
People from Algiers
University of Algiers alumni
Academic staff of the University of Paris
Commandeurs of the Ordre des Palmes Académiques
Academic staff of the Collège de France
Winners of the Prix Broquette-Gonin (literature)
French people of colonial Algeria